Calling Card is the sixth studio album and eighth album overall by Irish singer/guitarist Rory Gallagher.  A 1976 release, it was his second of four albums released on Chrysalis Records in the 1970s. Deep Purple/Rainbow bass guitarist Roger Glover co-produced with Gallagher: it was the first time that Gallagher worked with a "name" producer and the only successful such collaboration. It was also the last album Gallagher would do with Rod de'Ath (drums) and Lou Martin (keyboards). After Calling Card, Gallagher retained only his long-time bass guitarist Gerry McAvoy and hired Ted McKenna on drums. This revised power trio was Gallagher's line up for the next five years when Brendan O'Neil took the sticks.

Recording
The sessions for the album began at Musicland Studios in Munich, Germany, in the summer of 1976. Glover came on board as co-producer after having met Gallagher when the latter opened for Deep Purple on an American tour. The choice of Glover signified a conscious attempt by Gallagher to try new directions from the hard rock he was best known for. Calling Card is one of his most diverse albums. It also reflects the synergy that the band had developed after years of playing together. As producer Roger Glover commented “they all seemed very dedicated to Rory, there was an allegiance, born of years of smoky clubs and endless journeys”.  This was the fifth and last release featuring this line-up.

Reaction

The album is often considered one of Gallagher's finest studio offerings with Allmusic giving the album 4.5 stars out of 5.  In its August 2005 issue, Guitar Player'''s "Oeuvre Easy" feature on Gallagher praised its "brilliant songs" and "rockin' edge" and listed it in the "Inspired" section of his catalogue. Irish folk group The Dubliners later covered "Barley And Grape Rag" on their 1992 release, 30 Years A-Greying.

1999 remaster
The album was reissued by Buddah Records in 1999 along with the rest of Gallagher's catalogue. As with the rest of the reissues, the album featured remastered sound, newly written liner notes by Gallagher's brother Donal, and bonus tracks "Rue the Day" and "Public Enemy" (an early version of a track that later appeared on Gallagher's 1979 album Top Priority'').

Track listing
All tracks composed by Rory Gallagher.

Personnel
Rory Gallagher – vocals, guitar and harmonica
Gerry McAvoy – bass guitar
Lou Martin – keyboards
Rod de'Ath – drums
Technical
Hans Menzel, Mack – engineer

References

External links
Rory Gallagher's Official Site

1976 albums
Rory Gallagher albums
Albums produced by Roger Glover
Albums produced by Rory Gallagher
Buddah Records albums
Albums with cover art by Mick Rock